This is a list of unincorporated communities in the U.S. state of Texas, listed by county. This may include disincorporated communities, towns with no incorporated status, ghost towns, or census-designated places.

See also
List of cities in Texas
List of cities in Texas by population

References

Texas geography-related lists
 
Texas